The 1975 NFL season was the 56th regular season of the National Football League. 

Instead of a traditional Thanksgiving Day game hosted by the Dallas Cowboys, the league scheduled a Buffalo Bills at St. Louis Cardinals contest. This was the first season since  that the Cowboys did not play on that holiday.

The playoff format was changed so that the division champions with the best regular season records were made the home teams for the divisional round, with the division champion advancing to the conference championship game with the best record hosting the title game. Previously, game sites rotated by division. The caveat stipulating that a wild card team could not face its own division champion in the divisional round was kept in force.

The season ended with Super Bowl X when the Pittsburgh Steelers repeated as champions by defeating the Dallas Cowboys  at the Orange Bowl in Miami.

Draft
The 1975 NFL Draft was held from January 28 to 29, 1975 at New York City's Hilton at Rockefeller Center. With the first pick, the Atlanta Falcons selected quarterback Steve Bartkowski from the University of California.

New officials
Jerry Seeman, who would go on to serve as referee for Super Bowl XXIII and Super Bowl XXV before a 10-year tenure as the NFL's Director of Officiating from 1991–2001, was hired as a line judge. Fred Swearingen, the referee in the 1972 Raiders-Steelers playoff game which produced the Immaculate Reception, was demoted to his former position, field judge. Gene Barth, the line judge on Jim Tunney's crew the previous four seasons, was promoted.

Major rule changes
After a fourth down incomplete pass goes in or through the end zone, the other team will take possession at the previous line of scrimmage. Previously, it resulted in a touchback.
The penalty for pass interference on the offensive team is reduced from 15 yards to 10.
If there are fouls by both teams on the same play but one results in a player ejection, the penalties will offset but the player will still be ejected.
Referees were equipped with wireless microphones to announce penalties and clarify complex or unusual rulings to both fans and the media. The NFL thus became the first professional league in North America to adopt this technology.

Division races
Starting in 1970, through 2001, there were three divisions (Eastern, Central and Western) in each conference. The winners of each division, and a fourth “wild card” team based on the best non-division winner, qualified for the playoffs. The tiebreaker rules were changed to start with head-to-head competition, followed by division records, records against common records, and records in conference play.

National Football Conference

American Football Conference

Final standings

Tiebreakers
Baltimore finished ahead of Miami in the AFC East based on head-to-head sweep (2–0).
N.Y. Jets finished ahead of New England in the AFC East based on head-to-head sweep (2–0).
Minnesota was the top NFC playoff seed based on point rating system (Vikings were 1st in NFC in points scored and 2nd in NFC in points allowed for a combined rating of 3 while Rams were 5th in NFC in points scored and 1st in NFC in points allowed for a combined rating of 6).
Chicago finished ahead of Green Bay in the NFC Central based on better division record (2–4 to Packers’ 1–5).

Playoffs

Awards

Coaching changes

Offseason
Atlanta Falcons: Marion Campbell began his first full season as head coach. He replaced Norm Van Brocklin, who was fired after starting the 1974 season at 2–6.
Baltimore Colts: Ted Marchibroda joined the Colts as head coach. Howard Schnellenberger was fired after three games into the 1974 season, and General Manager Joe Thomas then served for the remainder of the season.
Chicago Bears: Abe Gibron was fired and replaced by Jack Pardee.
Cleveland Browns: Forrest Gregg replaced the fired Nick Skorich.
Green Bay Packers: Dan Devine left to join the Notre Dame Fighting Irish. Former Packers quarterback Bart Starr was named to replace Devine.
Houston Oilers: Bum Phillips replaced Sid Gillman.
Kansas City Chiefs: Hank Stram, the team's only head coach in franchise history, was relieved of his duties. Paul Wiggin was named as the team's new head coach.

In-season
New Orleans Saints: John North was fired after a 1–5 start to the season. Ernie Hefferle then served as interim.
New York Jets: Charley Winner was fired nine games into the season after only posting two wins. Offensive coordinator Ken Shipp served as interim for the last five games.

Stadium changes
 The home of the Atlanta Falcons, Atlanta Stadium, was renamed Atlanta–Fulton County Stadium, reflecting Fulton County as a co-owner of the stadium
 The Detroit Lions moved from Tiger Stadium to the Silverdome in Pontiac, Michigan
 The New Orleans Saints moved from Tulane Stadium to the Louisiana Superdome
 While Giants Stadium in East Rutherford, New Jersey, remained under construction, the New York Giants move from the Yale Bowl in New Haven, Connecticut, to Shea Stadium, temporarily sharing it with the Jets

Uniform changes
 The Houston Oilers switched from blue to white helmets.
 The New Orleans Saints switched from gold to white pants.
 The New York Giants introduced new uniforms that featured blue jerseys, red trim, and white pants; and white jerseys, red trim, and blue pants. This new design emphasized a widen striping pattern with the accent color white. The lowercase "ny" helmet logo was replaced by a striped uppercase "NY", while the face masks were changed from gray to white.
 The Cleveland Browns switched from white to orange pants (stripe to match helmet). The face masks were changed from gray to white.

Television
This was the second year under the league's four-year broadcast contracts with ABC, CBS, and NBC to televise Monday Night Football, the NFC package, and the AFC package, respectively. CBS restored The NFL Today title for its pregame show. Brent Musburger was named as its new host, former player Irv Cross as an analyst, and former Miss America Phyllis George as one of its reporters. 

NBC's pregame show GrandStand made its debut, hosted by Jack Buck (who had left CBS after the previous season) and Bryant Gumbel.

References

NFL Record and Fact Book
NFL History 1971–1980 (Last accessed December 4, 2005)
Total Football: The Official Encyclopedia of the National Football League

National Football League
 
1975